Estreito da Calheta (Portuguese for strait of Calheta) is a civil parish in the municipality of Calheta in the Portuguese island of Madeira. The population in 2011 was 1,607, in an area of 14.32 km2.

References

Parishes of Calheta, Madeira